Izvor (Bulgarian, Macedonian, Romanian and Serbian for "Spring") may refer to:

Bulgaria
 , a village in Dimovo Municipality
 Izvor, Burgas Province, a village in Burgas Municipality
 , a village in Radomir Municipality
 , a village in Rodopi Municipality
 Izvor, Sofia Province, a village in Slivnitsa Municipality

North Macedonia
 Izvor, Čaška, a village in the Čaška Municipality
 , a village in the Kičevo Municipality
 Izvor, Lipkovo, a village in the Lipkovo Municipality

Romania
 Izvor, a village in Cornereva Commune, Caraș-Severin County
 Izvor, a village in Șimnicu de Sus Commune, Dolj County
 Izvor metro station, a metro station in Bucharest
 Izvor (Crișul Repede), a tributary of the Crișul Repede in Bihor County
 Izvor, a tributary of the Jitin in Caraș-Severin County
 Izvor (Jiu), a tributary of the Jiu in Hunedoara County
 Izvor (Mureș), a tributary of the Mureș in Arad County
 Izvor (Neajlov), a tributary of the Neajlov in Dâmbovița County

Serbia
 Izvor (Babušnica), a village in the Babušnica Municipality
 Izvor (Bosilegrad), a village in the Bosilegrad Municipality
 Izvor (Paraćin), a village in the Paraćin Municipality
 Izvor (Pirot), a village in the Pirot Municipality
 Izvor (Svrljig), a village in the Svrljig Municipality
 Izvor (Žitorađa), a village in the Žitorađa Municipality
 , a village in the Novo Brdo Municipality

Other uses
 Izvor (album), a 2018 studio album by Macedonian singer Karolina Gočeva

See also 
 Izvori (disambiguation)
 Izvorul (disambiguation)
 Izvoarele (disambiguation)